Joel Barry Pollak (born 25 April 1977) is a South African-American conservative political commentator, writer, and attorney. He currently serves as the senior-editor-at-large for Breitbart News. In 2010, he was the Republican nominee for U.S. Congress from Illinois's 9th congressional district, losing to incumbent Democrat Jan Schakowsky with 31% of the vote.

Personal life
Pollak was born to a Jewish family in Johannesburg, South Africa. His parents moved to the United States in 1977, and became United States citizen in 1987. He grew up in the Chicago suburbs, principally in Skokie. He attended Solomon Schechter Day School and Niles North High School, where he was the class valedictorian in 1995.
Pollak attended Harvard College, and graduated magna cum laude in 1999, with a joint degree in Social Studies and Environmental Science & Public Policy (ESPP). He earned a master's degree in Jewish Studies from the University of Cape Town in 2006. From 2002 to 2006, he was chief speechwriter for Tony Leon, leader of the Democratic Alliance, and is a family friend of Leon's successor Helen Zille. He then enrolled at Harvard Law School. He married Julia Inge Pollak (née Bertelsmann) in December 2009. She is a black South African who is said to have converted to Judaism.  Pollak has described himself as an Orthodox Jew.

Pollak was politically liberal in his early life, being active in groups which he later described as "the forebears of today's ANTIFA or Occupy movement". His political views began to shift toward the right after several experiences as a student in South Africa which he described as waking him up "from a left-wing worldview".

Career

Public office 

In 2010, Pollak was the Republican nominee for U.S. Congress from Illinois's 9th congressional district, challenging incumbent Democrat Jan Schakowsky, whom he had voted for while still a Democrat (prior to 2006). Pollak was endorsed by the Chicago Tea Party, and referred to himself as a Tea Party Republican.

He lost, garnering 31.1% of the votes to Schakowsy's 66.3%.

Breitbart News 
After losing the election, Pollak was asked by Andrew Breitbart to become in-house counsel at Breitbart News, and Pollak moved to California. He later became editor-in-chief of the website.

After Breitbart reporter Michelle Fields alleged she was attacked by Donald Trump 2016 presidential campaign manager Corey Lewandowski, leaked internal memos showed that Pollak ordered staffers to stop defending Fields.

Pollak also posted a lengthy article to the website questioning Fields's account of the incident. Fields and fellow editor Ben Shapiro resigned over the incident, and questioned the site's support of Trump.

Publications
Pollak's first book, The Kasrils Affair: Jews and Minority Politics in the New South Africa (Double Storey, 2009), is based on his master's thesis, and uses debates involving the Jewish community, particularly Ronnie Kasrils, as a window onto minority politics in general in post-apartheid South Africa. His second book, Don't Tell Me Words Don't Matter: How Rhetoric Won the 2008 Presidential Election (HC Press, 2009), is self-published, and describes the role played by speeches in Barack Obama's victory over John McCain. Pollak's third book, See No Evil: 19 Hard Truths The Left Can't Handle, was released in 2016. He co-authored How Trump Won: The Inside Story of a Revolution with Larry Schweikart in 2017. In 2020, Pollak published Red November: Will the Country Vote Red for Trump or Red for Socialism.

Pollak has written numerous op-eds and articles. While in law school, he wrote for the Harvard Law Record, and alleged on his blog that Palestinian Authority chairman Yasser Arafat faked his blood donation for the victims of the 9/11 terror attacks.

References

External links

 Pollak For Congress Campaign Website
 
Campaign contributions at OpenSecrets.org

1977 births
American political candidates
Harvard Law School alumni
Illinois Republicans
Jewish American people in Illinois politics
Jewish American writers
Living people
American male non-fiction writers
Breitbart News people
South African Jews
American Orthodox Jews
Harvard College alumni
California Republicans
University of Cape Town alumni
Tea Party movement activists
21st-century American Jews